Penwortham is a small town in the Clare Valley, South Australia, along the Horrocks Highway, approximately 10 kilometres south of Clare and 14 kilometres north of Auburn.

Geography
Penwortham is surrounded by natural eucalyptus bushland and a section of the Skilly Hills, which in turn forms part of the Mount Lofty Ranges. There are two significant peaks nearby, Mount Oakden named after John Oakden, and Mount Horrocks, named after John Horrocks. The Hill River rises about 3 kilometres east of Penwortham.

History
The village of Penwortham was founded by settler, pioneer and explorer, John Horrocks (22 March 1818 – 23 September 1846). Horrocks arrived in the colony of South Australia on his 21st birthday, 22 March 1839, less than three years after its proclamation by Governor John Hindmarsh. After meeting Edward John Eyre, who told him of potentially good farmland to the north of Adelaide, John Horrocks and a servant, John Green, set off to find the area Eyre had described to him. Horrocks settled in a region that he believed to be along the Hutt River and named his establishment Hope Farm. Later in 1839, the first stone cottage of the settlement was commenced and, in 1840, Horrocks and his servants built stone stables for horses, which were then very rare and valuable in the new colony. For a short time, this was the only inland European settlement north of Adelaide and Gawler.

The following year saw the completion of an inn, The Derby Arms, which was built to accommodate the many new travellers passing north through Penwortham. The year after that (1842), the first foundations were laid for a flour mill, which did not see full operation until 1856, when all its working parts finally arrived from Europe. 1842 was also the year that the first foundation stone was laid down for the beginning of the manor house at Hope Farm.

Horrocks died in 1846 as a result of a hunting accident at Lake Gill, just north of the present day city of Port Augusta. By that time, Penwortham had become quite an established town and included a butcher, general store, tailor, school and blacksmith. The next year (1847), an unofficial post office began operation, with the local publican, James Bleechmore, acting as postmaster. In 1851, building began on St Mark's Anglican Church. Completion of St Mark's occurred in 1855, with the installation of a bell, turret and porch.

A new era of transport and industry began in 1915, when the construction of the Riverton to Spalding railway line passed through the town. It brought about many changes, and included the demolition of the manor house at Hope Farm, as this was in its direct line. By now, the main industries in the town and surrounding farms were fruit, dried currant and dairy production. These continued until just after the Second World War, when competition from the Riverland meant that a viable industry in the Clare Valley was untenable. As a result, the pre-war advent and post-war continuation of the fledgling wine industry began to flourish in the region.

A monument was built and unveiled on 22 September 1946 commemorating the life, exploration and untimely death of the town's founder, John Ainsworth Horrocks. It was built by Gordon Ross and William Robins and now stands by the side of Main North Road, near St Mark's Church.

Name
Penwortham shares its name with the town of Penwortham in Lancashire, England. Penwortham (in the United Kingdom) was the home of Richard Arkwright, the inventor of the water frame that kick-started the textile industry in the late 18th century. John Horrocks is likely to have been a descendant of Arkwright. Penwortham is a town name with a precise meaning: a settlement on a hill by a ford. Horrocks originally called his settlement Penwortham-on-the-Hill.  He was born at his family home of Penwortham Hall, near Preston, Lancashire. The name is a hybrid of the Welsh pen, meaning headland and an Old English word worphamm, meaning enclosed homestead.

The town today
Penwortham today is a sleepy, but beautiful village. Pearson Wines are located on the Main Road, a beautiful old stone building creating a delightful cellar door. St. Marks Church is a treasure, with explorer John Horrocks buried in the adjacent cemetery. John Horrocks Cottage (formerly Greens Cottage), built in 1839 and owned and operated by the local historical society, opens to visitors on the first Sunday of each month. The Riesling Trail, on the eastern side links the village to Auburn and Clare for walkers and cyclists looking to take in the ambience of the local countryside.
The scenic drive to the Skillogalee Valley, west of the Main North Road (Horrocks Highway), can be accessed from Penwortham. This beautiful scenic drive will take you to several well-known cellar doors, Mitchell Wines, Penna Lane Wines, Kilikanoon Wines and Skillogalee Wines and Restaurant.

Governance
Penwortham is in the District Council of Clare and Gilbert Valleys, the state electoral district of Frome, and the Australian House of Representatives Division of Grey.

References

Towns in South Australia
Populated places established in 1839
Mid North (South Australia)